The Fox Theater in Hutchinson, Kansas is an Art Deco theater built in 1930.  It was listed on the National Register of Historic Places in 1989.

It was designed by the Boller Brothers, and A.R. Mann and Co. served as supervising architects.

References

External links

 Hutchinson's Historic Fox Theatre

Theatres completed in 1930
Art Deco architecture in Kansas
Buildings and structures in Reno County, Kansas
Hutchinson, Kansas
Tourist attractions in Reno County, Kansas
Theatres in Kansas
Theatres on the National Register of Historic Places in Kansas
National Register of Historic Places in Reno County, Kansas